VII Army Corps (VII. Armeekorps) was a corps in the German Army during World War II. It was destroyed in August 1944 during the Jassy–Kishinev Offensive (August 1944).

Commanders

 Infantry General (General der Infanterie) Wilhelm Adam, October 1934 – 1 October 1935
 Artillery General (General der Artillerie) Walther von Reichenau, 1 October 1935 – 4 February 1938 
 Infantry General (General der Infanterie) Eugen Ritter von Schobert, 4 February 1938 – 31 January 1940
 Lieutenant-General (Generalleutnant) Gotthard Heinrici, 1 February 1940 – April 1940
 Colonel General (Generaloberst) Eugen Ritter von Schobert, 9 April 1940 – 25 October 1940
 Artillery General (General der Artillerie) Wilhelm Fahrmbacher, 25 October 1940 – 8 January 1942 
 Artillery General (General der Artillerie) Ernst-Eberhard Hell, 8 January 1942 – 5 October 1943 
 Infantry General (General der Infanterie) Anton Dostler, 5 October 1943 – 30 November 1943  
 Artillery General (General der Artillerie) Ernst-Eberhard Hell, 30 November 1943 – August 1944

Area of operations
Poland - September 1939 - May 1940 
France - May 1940 - June 1941 
Eastern Front, central sector - June 1941 - August 1944

See also
 List of German corps in World War II

External links

Army,07
Military units and formations established in 1934
1934 establishments in Germany
Military units and formations disestablished in 1944